The 1926 Minnesota Golden Gophers football team represented the University of Minnesota in the 1926 Big Ten Conference football season. In their second year under head coach Clarence Spears, the Golden Gophers compiled a 5–3 record and outscored their opponents by a combined score of 269 to 57.

Fullback Herb Joesting was named an All-American by the Associated Press and Look Magazine. Joestring, Tackle Mitchell Gary, guard Harold Hanson and end Roger Wheeler were named All-Big Ten first team.

Total attendance for the season was 156,032, which averaged out to 31,206 per game. The season high for attendance was against rival Michigan.

Schedule

Game summaries

Michigan
On November 20, 1926, Minnesota lost to Michigan by a 7–6 score at Memorial Stadium. The game was the last for Michigan under head coach Fielding Yost. Herb Joesting scored on a short run in the second quarter, but Peplaw missed the attempted at extra point. Michigan trailed 6–0 in the fourth quarter when Nydahl of Minnesota fumbled. Oosterbaan picked up the loose ball and ran 58 yards for a touchdown. Friedman drop-kicked the extra point.

References

Minnesota
Minnesota Golden Gophers football seasons
Minnesota Golden Gophers football